Joachim Victor Birkeland Kjelsaas von Kwetzinsky-Stetzenkow (born 8 April 1978), known as Joachim Kwetzinsky, is a Norwegian pianist.

Background 

He is a son of the author Oddbjørn Birkeland and the pianist Berit Kjelsaas Kwetzinsky, and a stepson of the scenographer Truls Kwetzinsky (born Wassily Michail Fjodor Grossow von Palm von Kwetzinsky-Stetzenkow), who is himself a son of the Russian-born music critic Wassily von Kwetzinsky and a grandson of the Russian general Mikhail Kvetsinsky, who both came to Norway in 1920 as refugees from the Russian Revolution.

Education and work 
Joachim Kwetzinsky studied at the Norwegian Academy of Music, and has been a student of Einar Steen-Nøkleberg, Liv Glaser and Jiri Hlinka. He has given concerts in over 20 countries and has published several albums. He is known for his collaboration with David Arthur Skinner, Johannes Martens and Marcus Paus, and published the album Marcus Paus i 2013.

Prizes 
He won the Concours Grieg Prize in 2002 and the Robert Levin Prize in 2009.

Albums 
 Polyphonic Dialogues, 2L
 Figments and Fragments, 2L
 Marcus Paus, Aurora, 2013

References

External links 
 Official website

1978 births
Living people
Norwegian people of Russian descent
Norwegian Academy of Music alumni
Norwegian classical pianists
21st-century classical pianists